The 2019–20 LIU Sharks men's basketball team represented Long Island University during the 2019–20 NCAA Division I men's basketball season. The Sharks were led by third-year head coach Derek Kellogg, and played their home games at the Steinberg Wellness Center, with some home games at the Barclays Center, as members of the Northeast Conference (NEC).

This was the first season for the LIU Sharks, which is a consolidation of the two athletic programs, the Division I LIU Brooklyn Blackbirds and Division II LIU Post Pioneers.

They finished the season 15–18, 9–9 in NEC play to finish in a tie for fifth place. They defeated Fairleigh Dickinson in the quarterfinals of the NEC tournament before losing in the semifinals to Robert Morris.

Previous season 
In the final year as the LIU Brooklyn, the Blackbirds finished the 2018–19 season 16–16 overall, 9–9 in NEC play to finish in a tie for fifth place. As the No. 6 seed in the NEC tournament, they advanced to the semifinals, where they lost to Saint Francis (PA).

Roster

 

Source

Schedule and results

|-
!colspan=9 style=| Non-conference regular season

|-
!colspan=9 style=| Northeast Conference regular season

 

 

|-
!colspan=9 style=| NEC tournament

Source

References

LIU Sharks men's basketball seasons
LIU
LIU
LIU